The 2019 Indianapolis City–County Council elections took place on November 5, 2019. With all 25 seats up for election. Before the elections Democrats held a 14–11-seat majority. Primaries for the council were held May 7, 2019. Following the elections Democrats expanded their control of the council with a 20–5 majority. This marked the first time in Indianapolis history that Democrats would hold a super majority on the council. In the Indianapolis mayoral election held at the same time, Democrat Joe Hogsett beat Republican Jim Merritt 72% to 27%.

Results summary

Close races 
Seats where the margin of victory was under 10%:

  gain
  gain
  gain
 
 
  gain
 
  gain

Other seats that flipped party control:

  gain
  gain

Results by district

References

Indianapolis
Elections 2019
Indianapolis 2019
Indianapolis City-County Council